Jasmin Dizdar (born 8 June 1961) is a British-Bosnian film director, screenwriter and author best known for his feature film Beautiful People and his World War Two thriller Chosen. Jasmin Dizdar also published a book on cinema, which achieved a high volume of sales, with over 50,000 copies sold.

Early life

Jasmin Dizdar was born and grew up in his Bosnian hometown of Zenica, where his gift for creative writing was spotted early on by primary school teacher of literature. With her guidance and encouragement, he sent his short story “History Hour” to a regional competition and won his first award for the best short story.

When he was 12, Dizdar’s love affair with movies had begun, and he soon became a prolific cinema-goer. There were four theaters in Zenica, and Dizdar used an intricate system to get into them for free: he made facsimiles of movie tickets by scavenging for stubs in rubbish bins, then collecting the other halves from patrons as they came out of theaters. Gluing torn bits together and re-using them as fake cinema tickets enabled him to see the same film several times for free, particularly multiple showings of such Westerns as Sergio Leone's A Fistful of Dollars, The Good, the Bad and the Ugly and Once Upon a Time in the West. Because Dizdar was so tall for his age (he is now 6 foot 6), he managed to see Bernardo Bertolucci's film Last Tango in Paris, despite its 18 rated certificate.

During his time at secondary school, he was an actor in the Bosnian theatre play Hanka, based on the novel by Isak Samokovlija as well as being adapted for the 1955 film Hanka directed by Yugoslav film director Slavko Vorkapić. The play premiered in Zenica's Old National Theatre.

As a teenager Jasmin Dizdar joined a local film club where he wrote, edited and directed numerous short documentary, drama and experimental films and began to take interest in film theory, particularly Russian structuralist film theory. His last Bosnian film Butterfly Dance (featuring an ensemble cast from Zenica's National Theatre) got him into the Film and TV School of the Academy of Performing Arts in Prague, Czech Republic.

Career

Jasmin Dizdar studied film directing at the Prague film school FAMU. There he became known for his daring satirical humour often casting ordinary people, Czech actors and filmmakers who were not favoured with the communist regime. Legendary Czech film director Elmar Klos (Academy Award winner for the film The Shop on Main Street) gave Grand Jury prize to Dizdar's graduation film After Silence. This student film is preserved as a national treasure in the Czech national film archive.

During his film studies Jasmin Dizdar wrote, what is today regarded as daringly unique piece of film theory about his fellow FAMU alumni – double-Oscar-winning Czech-American film director Miloš Forman. This is regarded as a very rare type of analytical film theory written by a foreign-film student whilst studying in the totalitarian communist regime about an officially banned film director, who was often regarded as an “enemy of the state”, during the time. His friendship with internationally acclaimed Czech cinematographer Miroslav Ondricek and Czech film critic Eva Zaoralova led to the publishing of Dizdar’s book about Forman, Audition for a Director. This book is remembered as a unique in-depth analysis of a legendary filmmaker. The book was published in a record number of fifty thousand copies.

After graduating from university with a Red Diploma (i.e. highest honours) Dizdar lived briefly in France before settling in United Kingdom where he wrote number of screenplays for BBC Television and a radio play for BBC Radio 4.

Beautiful People is an award-winning and critically acclaimed feature film written and directed by Jasmin Dizdar. Her Majesty's Principal Secretary of State for Culture, Media and Sport paid official visit to Cannes Film Festival world premier of Beautiful People where the film received a ten-minute standing ovation. The film won an award for the best film in Un Certain Regard category at the 1999 Cannes Film Festival, an audience award "Gold Gryphon" at Saint-Petersburg International Festival of Festivals, and many other international awards. Jasmin Dizdar became the second Bosnian filmmaker (after Emir Kusturica) to win a major award at the Cannes Film Festival and the first and only Bosnian filmmaker born and raised in Zenica, to achieve such a prestige international recognition.

Based on its success at Cannes, distributors in over 30 countries purchased the rights to Beautiful People, making it an international sensation. Dizdar is loath to label the film a comedy or anything else. He says that Beautiful People embraces every emotion, which is why people all around the world have embraced it. After Beautiful People was screened for several weeks in the world’s capitals, alongside Stanley Kubrick’s film Eyes Wide Shut, Robert Altman’s Cookie's Fortune and Pedro Almodóvar’s Oscar-winning All About My Mother, Jasmin exclaimed during an interview with his friend, world-music renowned BBC Radio London DJ, Charlie Gillett: “Film directors like Stanley Kubrick, Robert Altman and Pedro Almodóvar standing shoulder to shoulder with me in London, New York, Paris and Tokyo makes my teenage dream come true. If a car were to hit me now, I’d die a happy man.”

Beautiful People, like Jasmin Dizdar's other films, is a satire. Jasmin Dizdar's satire could be described as a seraphic-smile sardonicism which combines everyday and imaginative realism with a musical and playful irony. The New York Times film critic A. O. Scott describes Jasmin Dizdar as a filmmaker: "At once sarcastic and entirely sincere, he directs with an extraordinary exuberance and self-confidence, intelligence and grace, with a style that combines realism with a playful, improvisatory sense of formal possibility. Jasmin Dizdar's camera hurtles through the scenes like a child in a toy store, grabbing at every detail as though it were a shiny, precious prize, acknowledging both the fundamental ridiculousness of the war and its inassimilable horror."

Following Beautiful People, Jasmin Dizdar wrote and directed a segment for the French feature film Les Europeens (2006) based on a burning social topic of refugees finding a various ingenious ways to enter Europe. Jasmin Dizdar's segment is about an African refugee who tries to smuggle himself into Europe by stowing away in the landing-gear bay of a passenger plan that departs from North Africa. When the landing-gear bay opens as the plane makes its descent, he tumbles out from a few thousand feet over Rome and falls on the car-roof of a middle-class religious woman who begins to believe that the refugee is a gift from God.

Jasmin Dizdar’s next feature film Chosen (2016) starring Harvey Keitel, Ana Ularu and Luke Mably is a moving drama of love, courage and survival against all odds. Set during the Second World War, the film tells the extraordinary story of a young lawyer who uses a clever ploy to fight the Nazis to save thousands of lives. Harvey Keitel plays the lawyer in present-day New York, USA.

Personal life

As a young adolescent Jasmin Dizdar discovered that Nazis killed his paternal grandparents during the Second World War.  A post-war orphanage changed his father's original surname from Dizdar to Dizdarević (most of former Yugoslavs surnames end with "ić"). After thirty years of living under surname Dizdarević, he took back his grandfather’s original surname Dizdar.

Jasmin Dizdar currently lives in the UK, London, since 1989, and is a British citizen since 1993. He has a daughter who is also a filmmaker and visual artist.

Filmography
 Butterfly Dance (1984)
 Mr Slave (1985)
 Crucifixion (1986)
 Heroes Will Be Heroes (1987)
 After Silence (1988)
 Our Sweet Homeland (1989)
 Beautiful People (1999)
 Les Europeens (2006)
 Chosen (2016)

Other works
Horseman (BBC, 1992) - television drama
Intimate Tragedy (BBC, 1994) - radio drama
Miloš Forman Audition for a Director

Bibliography
Yosefa Loshitzky: Screening Strangers
Roger Ebert: The Ultimute Guide to the Best 1000 Modern Movies
Andrew Horton: Screenwriting for a Global Market

References

External links
Jasmin Dizdar (IMDb) - 
Jasmin Dizdar BritFilms  
Profile: Jasmin Dizdar (4 pages)  
Just Beautiful - by a film critic for Time magazine Richard Schickel 
Beautiful Film - by a Pulitzer Prize-winning American film critic Roger Joseph Ebert  
Reconnect what chaos rips apart - by a film critic for New York Times A. O. Scott 
To the street - a special in-depth analysis by a scholar Lesley Smith 
Jasmin Dizdar interview in Paris, France  
Beautiful People (French trailer)  
Beautiful People (UK / USA Amazon trailer) 
Beautiful People (USA trailer) 

1961 births
Writers from Zenica
Living people
Academy of Performing Arts in Prague alumni
British screenwriters
British film directors
English-language film directors
Bosniaks of Bosnia and Herzegovina
Bosnia and Herzegovina screenwriters
Bosnia and Herzegovina film directors